Aaron Renier is an American comics artist born in Green Bay, Wisconsin. Between 2000 and 2009, he lived in Portland, Oregon and Brooklyn, New York before settling in West Town, Chicago, where he lives with his wife and fellow artist, Jessica Campbell. His graphic novel Spiral-Bound was published by Top Shelf Productions in September 2005 and won him the 2006 Eisner award for "Talent Deserving of Wider Recognition". In 2008, he began providing illustrations for the book series The Knights' Tales written by Gerald Morris. He also Alice Shertle's 2009 picture book An Anaconda Ate My Homework. He has also created The Unsinkable Walker Bean and illustrated Charlotte Perkins Gilman's The Yellow Wallpaper. He sometimes collaborates with colorist Alec Longstreth.

References

External links
 
 Interview with The Daily Crosshatch
 interview with Sequetialtart

American comics artists
Artists from Wisconsin
People from Green Bay, Wisconsin
Living people
Year of birth missing (living people)
Artists from Portland, Oregon